A View from a Hill is a 2005 British television film based on M. R. James's short story of the same title. It was adapted by Luke Watson and Peter Harness for BBC Four's revival of the series A Ghost Story for Christmas. It stars Mark Letheren as Dr Fanshawe.

Plot summary
The film opens with Dr Fanshawe, a historian, waiting at a railway station for a car to arrive to take him to the house of Squire Richards, where he is to catalogue and value an archaeological collection which is to be sold. He gives up waiting and rides his bicycle to Squire Richards's house. On the way one of his bags falls off. When he unpacks his luggage later he finds his binoculars broken. He borrows a pair from Squire Richards.

During a walk through the countryside with the Squire, Fanshawe looks at a plain field through the binoculars and spots an abbey which is invisible other than through the glasses. Next to it is Gallows Hill, where a number of people were hanged. Richards explains that it was the site of an abbey that was dissolved by Henry VIII and there is nothing left of it but a few stones.

That night Fanshawe goes alone to Gallows Hill. He hears rustling in the bushes and comes to the spot where the gallows once stood. Thoroughly frightened by the feeling that he is being watched, he stumbles out of the woods and makes his way back to the Squire's house.

At dinner that evening Richards's butler, Patten, explains to Fanshawe how a local clockmaker called Baxter became obsessed with the old abbey and began going out at night to dig up the bones of the hanged men. While he was repairing his binoculars he bewitched them so that they would show the abbey to anyone who looked through them. Baxter then disappeared without a trace.

That night Fanshawe has a nightmare in which he goes to the bathroom to get a drink, only to find that the water in the cup is cloudy and contaminated. Hearing the water in the bathtub stop dripping, Fanshawe turns round, to be terrified by a shadowy figure lurking in the darkness wearing a skull mask.

The next day Fanshawe goes back to the site of the abbey with the boiled bones and sketches. Looking through the binoculars at the details of the abbey, he spots a figure lurking by one of the pillars, hears rustling and is knocked unconscious by an unseen attacker. He  wakes after dark to find himself being dragged up Gallows Hill by an unseen force to the spot where the gallows stood.

Richards, Patten and a search party go looking for Fanshawe, and find his abandoned bike and sketches. They also spot a flock of birds gathering on top of Gallows Hill. Venturing up to investigate, they are met with the sight of Fanshawe hanging. He subsequently recovers.

The next day Patten burns all the sketches and boiled bones in a bonfire, and throws the binoculars in after them. Squire Richards accompanies Fanshawe to the railway station and then leaves. As Fanshawe sits on a bench waiting for the train he hears a loud rustling noise in the woods behind him.

Cast
 Mark Letheren - Dr Fanshawe
 Pip Torrens - Squire Richards
 David Burke - Patten
 Simon Linnel - Baxter

Production
The programme was made on location in the Thames Valley in November 2005.

The Manor House in Chertsey, originally named Barrow Hills, featured as the home of Squire Richards. It was built in 1853 and was purchased by the Ministry of Supply in 1952 for use as an officers' mess. In 2004 it was purchased by a consortium headed by Crest Nicholson PLC. Since then it has been used for several films and TV dramas.

The Manor House and other locations in Turville were chosen because of their proximity to London.

The production was made on a limited budget, and several planned scenes had to be omitted or reduced for budgetary reasons.

References

External links
 
 

Adaptations of works by M. R. James
Television films based on short fiction
2005 television films
2005 films
A Ghost Story for Christmas